European multilateral defence procurement refers to the collective armaments purchasing policies of European nations.

Traditionally European countries have either developed their own weapon systems or bought 'off the shelf' systems usually NATO-sponsored from the United States or from the Soviet Union, now from Russia. Furthermore, identical projects in differing countries were recognised as a waste of resources. Likewise they hope to establish a profitable export competing the American one.

The European Defence Agency was established in 2004 to create a stronger European market for military equipment.

History
The Eurofighter Typhoon is the latest in a line of joint aircraft projects between the Western European powers.  Previously the United Kingdom, Germany and Italy had cooperated in producing the Panavia Tornado in the 1970s, and the UK and France had cooperated in producing the SEPECAT Jaguar. The Eurocopter Tiger is developed by France and Germany and was also bought by Spain. Franco-Italian naval projects include the s and FREMM multipurpose frigates.

Industry
While European military budgets remain fragmented and massive duplication in research and development exists, the European military industry has made some moves towards consolidation. British Aerospace (BAe) was widely expected to merge with Germany's DASA to form the first major European military-industrial giant. Instead in 1999 BAe merged with another British company, GEC's defence business (Marconi Electronic Systems), to form BAE Systems. As a result, in 2000, DASA merged with Aerospatiale-Matra to form EADS. 

In 2001 the formation of MBDA brought together the product portfolios of Aerospatiale Matra Missiles (of EADS), Alenia Marconi Systems missiles, and Matra BAe Dynamics to form Europe's largest missile manufacturer and number two globally after Raytheon.

In 2015, the German Krauss-Maffei Wegmann (KMW) and French Nexter merged under a joint holding company KMW+Nexter Defense Systems. Both companies are major producers of military land systems.

Other major European defence contractors include:
Airbus Defence and Space
Airbus Helicopters
Dassault Aviation
Damen Group
Diehl Defence
Kongsberg Defence & Aerospace
Leonardo S.p.A., including the former AgustaWestland
Naval Group
Navantia
Rheinmetall
Rolls-Royce
Saab Group
Safran
Thales Group
ThyssenKrupp Marine Systems

Products
Below are some examples of European products and the previously used weapons they may replace.
Aircraft and missiles:
A400M – replacing C-130 and Franco/German Transall
Eurofighter Typhoon – replacing F-4 Phantom II, F-16s, Mirage F-1, Tornado F.3
Eurocopter Tiger – for France, Germany and Spain
EH101 and NH90 – largely replacing European helicopters
Meteor – replacing AMRAAM as long-range AAM
ASRAAM and IRIS-T – replacing AIM-9 Sidewinder as short-range AAM
Land vehicles:
ASCOD IFV equipping the Austrian, Spanish and British armies, Puma IFV equipping the Germany army
Patria AMV and GTK Boxer APCs equipping various European armies
ATF Dingo, Fennek, Iveco LMV tactical vehicles used by various countries
PzH 2000 – replacing M109 Paladin
Naval vessels:
F-100-class frigates replacing US designed Knox-class frigates in Spain, Oliver Hazard Perry-class frigates in Australia and Dealey-class frigates in Norway.
Type 212 submarine, equipping the German, Italian navies, Type 214 submarine equipping the Greek and Portuguese navies,  equipping the Spanish Navy
s and FREMM multipurpose frigates both for the French and Italian navies
 and  LPDs, replacing s in the Netherlands and Spanish navies.

France's desire for military and industrial independence has motivated its continued pursuit of high-technology projects, for example the Dassault Rafale.

Multinational programmes can fail because of disagreements about price or capability. For example, while the UK terminated its collaboration with France and Italy on the next generation frigate (Horizon CNGF) and started a national Type 45 programme. However the warships will share some systems, primarily the MBDA Aster missile.

Then British Prime Minister Tony Blair came under pressure from President Bill Clinton to select Raytheon's future missile to arm the Eurofighter, however the UK government selected the European Meteor air-to-air missile. 

Airbus Group CEO Tom Enders has called the difficulties in coordinating European investment in the A400M program a "horror", and said "I am determined, at least for my company, not to ever again walk into such a program".

French President Emmanuel Macron and German Chancellor Angela Merkel have signalled their countries intention to co-operate on the development of a future combat aircraft to be produced as a replacement for Dassault Rafale and Eurofighter Typhoon.

Code of Conduct on Defence Procurement 
The European Union has adopted a code of conduct with the objective to inject transparency and competition into the military procurement. It is administered by the EDA and under its scope are contracts under Article 346 of TFEU, of at least €1 million and with the exclusions of weapons of mass destruction, cryptographic equipment and other procurements.

As of 2009 the code is adopted by Norway and all EDA members except Romania, who may join later.

See also 
 OCCAR
 European Border and Coast Guard Agency
 Common Security and Defence Policy
 European Defence Fund
 Permanent Structured Cooperation
 European Defence Agency

References

External links
 The British Library - finding information on the defence industry (PDF file)

Procurement
Military acquisition